Richard Francis Nallin (February 26, 1878 – September 7, 1956) was an American football player and coach and baseball player and umpire. He served as head football coach at Villanova College—now known as Villanova University—in 1899, compiling a record of 7–2–1.  Nallin was a Major League Baseball umpire from 1915 to 1932 for the American League.  He umpired the 1927 World Series and 1931 World Series. During his umpiring career, he was home plate umpire for three no-hitters: Ernie Koob's on May 5, 1917, Bob Groom's the very next day, and Charlie Robertson's perfect game on April 30, 1922. As of the end of the 2010 season, only two other umpires have called balls and strikes for two no-hitters in the same month: Bill Dinneen in September 1923 and Bill Deegan in May 1977.  He was also the home-plate umpire during Ty Cobb's final game on September 11, 1928.

Head coaching record

See also

 List of Major League Baseball umpires

References

External links
 
 

1878 births
1956 deaths
19th-century players of American football
Akron Champs players
Akron Rubbernecks players
Augusta Tourists players
Bridgeport Orators players
Harrisburg Senators players
Major League Baseball umpires
Sportspeople from Frederick, Maryland
Sportspeople from Scranton, Pennsylvania
Villanova Wildcats football coaches
Villanova Wildcats football players
York White Roses players
Youngstown Champs players